Wong Chi Hong (born 25 January 1999) is a former Hong Kong professional footballer who played as a midfielder or a striker.

References

External links
 HKFA
 
 

1999 births
Living people
Hong Kong footballers
Association football midfielders
Association football forwards
Happy Valley AA players
HK U23 Football Team players
Hong Kong Premier League players
Hong Kong First Division League players